On 20 January 2014, a Britten-Norman Islander light aircraft belonging to the Superior School of Aviation in Romania operating Flight 111 crashed in the Apuseni Mountains at an altitude of approximately , near the village of Petreasa, between Alba and Cluj counties. The aircraft was piloted by two crew and was transporting a five-person medical team from Bucharest to Oradea. The pilot and a medical student died, while the copilot and four medical doctors were injured.

Accident

The aircraft, property of the Superior School of Civil Aviation in Romania, took off at 13:35 from Aurel Vlaicu International Airport in Bucharest and was bound for Oradea International Airport, where it should have landed at 16:35. The flight was a humanitarian mission and was crewed by a 55-year-old with 16,000 hours flying experience) and a copilot. On board were a doctor from Fundeni Hospital, one from Elias Hospital, one from Saint Mary Hospital, another from a hospital in Beiuș, and a student at the Military Medical School in Bucharest. The team were to collect organs from a donor for a transplant operation.

The accident happened in poor weather conditions and the crew was flying according to instrument flight rules. One of the passengers reported the crash at 16:16 in a telephone call to the 112 emergency service. The Inspectorate for Emergency Situations Alba, part of Romanian General Inspectorate for Emergency Situations and the team of  Cluj was assigned to the rescue operation. The rescue team had difficulty finding the crash site, they did not know the precise location and the area was covered in snow and thick fog. Because of the fog, the SMURD helicopter from Mureș could not be used. Over 70 firefighters and policemen from the counties of Cluj, Bihor, and Alba and approximately 200 locals took part in the search for the wreck.

The pilot and the student died and the copilot was in a critical state, three of the doctors had multiple bone fractures and one had no severe wounds. All injured were taken to the Emergency Hospital in Cluj (Spitalul Clinic Județean de Urgență Cluj) and were admitted to the Intensive Care Unit.

Aircraft
The aircraft involved was a Britten-Norman BN-2A-27 Islander, registration YR-BNP.

Search operations
Emergency search and rescue services were delayed because they did not receive the proper coordinates of the crash site.
The ELT distress beacon operated correctly, but search and rescue services could not locate the beacon on the ground, on 121.5 MHz. Moscow Mission Control Centre said that they did not receive any signal from Romania on 406 MHz during the incident.

Using its internal GPS reference, Dr. Zamfir's phone showed coordinates , at  North of the actual site of the crash .

The main controversy in this accident is why all methods used to locate the crash site failed, delaying the search and rescue teams.

Investigation
The Romanian Government announced the start of two investigations. The first would look at the accident and the second the procedures followed by the rescue teams, which reached the scene only several hours after the crash.

In a preliminary investigation report, the Center for Investigation and Analysis for Civil Aviation Security (CIAS) said that the ELT distress beacon was type ARTEX C406-2. This beacon transmitting on frequencies 121.5 MHz, 243 MHz (now obsolete) and 406 MHz, using two different cables for antennas. The cable for 406 MHz antenna was not found at the crash scene, which explains why no signal received on 406 MHz.

Political impact
As a direct result of the crash of flight RFT111 and the response to it, the head of the national emergency response department, IGSU, resigned. One day later, also as a result, the Interior Minister Radu Stroe resigned. A passenger on board had died of hypothermia after surviving the crash because of the long emergency response. This has led to an overhaul of the country's emergency response methods.

In response to an open letter, Gary Machado, Executive Director of European Emergency Number Association assigned blame for the situation on Neelie Kroes, who at the time of the incident had not enacted European-level regulation requiring provision of GPS co-ordinates in emergencies. The lack of provision of this critical information from the mobile company of the 112 caller to the emergency services was recognised as a major factor in the lethal delay in the rescue.

References

Aviation accidents and incidents in 2014
Aviation accidents and incidents in Romania
Alba County
January 2014 events in Romania